Annika Maria Lantz, (born 9 March 1968) is a Swedish radio host, comedian and television presenter. She has worked at Sveriges Radio since 1993 when she started hosting a local radio show for Stockholm P5. She has since worked in the P3 shows Kvällspasset, Morgonpasset and her own show Lantz i P3 which was also broadcast on SVT for some time. The show has since been moved to both P1 and P4. Lantz has also done her own talkshow on SVT called I Afton Lantz. She's been a panel member on the TV4 comedy show Parlamentet. Lantz is currently hosting the radioshow Lantzkampen.

References

1968 births
Living people
Swedish television hosts
Swedish women television presenters